The Congress of Nationalities for a Federal Iran is a political alliance of political parties and advocacy groups, mostly underground or exiled, which campaigns for the replacement of the current Islamist government system in Iran with a secular, democratic, federal government. It has also called for antipersonnel landmines to be banned in Iran. Many of the member groups are concurrent advocates for the rights or self-determination of non-Persian Iranians, including Azeris, Kurds, Arabs, Turkmen, and Baloch.

The organization grew out of a conference held in London on 20 February 2005.

Member organizations
Azerbaijan Cultural Society
Balochistan National Movement – Iran
Balochistan People's Party
Balochistan United Front of Iran
Organisation of Kurmanj People (The Kurds in the region of North of Khorasan)
Democratic Party of Iranian Kurdistan
Democratic Solidarity Party of al-Ahwaz
Komala Party of Iranian Kurdistan
Organization for Defence of the Rights of Turkmen People
Southern Azerbaijan National Awakening Movement
National Movement of Iranian Turkmenistan
Azerbaijan Diplomatic Mission
Party of United Lurestan and Bakhtiari
Southern Azerbaijan Diplomatic Commission
Turkmen National Democratic Movement
Kurdistan Freedom Party

References

External links
Congress of Nationalities for a Federal Iran (in Persian)

Federalism in Iran
Federalist organizations
Iranian democracy movements
Organizations with year of establishment missing
Political opposition organizations
Political party alliances in Iran
Secularism in Iran